In Kind Direct is a charity in the United Kingdom founded in 1996 by King Charles III (the then Prince of Wales). The charity distributes new donated usable consumer goods from manufacturers and retailers to British charities working both domestically and abroad. The Prince of Wales is In Kind Direct's Royal founding patron. Robin Boles was In Kind Direct's CEO from 1996 until her retirement 2019. The role of CEO was taken on by Rosanne Gray in December 2019. 

Since 1996, the charity has distributed £297 million in value of goods from more than 1,257 companies. 11,655 charities and not-for-profit organisations have received products via In Kind Direct, helping millions of people in need every year.

Operations 

In Kind Direct provides a single contact point for companies with new goods to donate.  The charity has the logistics infrastructure to handle and store large quantities of goods and distribute them to charities. In Kind Direct accepts all kinds of stock including: pristine products, end of lines, slight seconds, samples, items with damaged packaging and returns. In Kind Direct uses an online catalogue which resembles a commercial retail website, but is only accessible to not-for-profit organisations.

In Kind Direct works for the public benefit by ensuring that the expenditure of other charities on essential goods is reduced, thus stretching their scarce resources and enabling them to help millions of people in need at home and abroad, while reducing environmental damage by diverting surplus product from landfill.

By opening up access to high quality products for charities with limited budgets, In Kind Direct enables charities to improve the service they offer, do more for their beneficiaries and help people they may not otherwise reach. Responding to In Kind Direct's 2020 Impact Survey, charitable organisations said that on average they are able to help twice as many people with In Kind Direct's support. 72% of charitable organisations said that they will use products from In Kind Direct to keep people clean and safe during the current pandemic.

Brand protection issues 

In Kind Direct addresses brand protection concerns by thoroughly vetting all organisations within its network and monitoring distribution carefully to ensure products are used for charitable purposes and to prevent stockpiling. Charities must contractually agree not to sell, trade or barter with the goods received from In Kind Direct.

The charity tracks all donations, has robust processes for investigating any possible breaches of these rules and reports back to funders and donors as to where the products have gone with case studies showing the impact made.

Examples of charity partners 

In Kind Direct's 11,476 charity partners include:

International network 

In 2013 In Kind Direct was the founding member of a new charity, In Kind Direct International (IKDI).  IKDI was established to set up a network of charities from a growing number of countries, all distributing donated surplus new goods from donors to charities, not for profit organisations, associations and social enterprises. Members of the IKDI Network work together to share information about donations and to share knowledge and expertise to enable goods to be distributed to charities and their beneficiaries in the most effective way. This network consists of three members : In Kind Direct in the United Kingdom, Innatura in Germany and Dons Solidaires in France. IKDI is currently seeking to expand into Northern Europe and Asia.

Sources 

Charities based in London
Environmental organisations based in London
Organizations established in 1996
The Prince's Charities

External links